Yasmine Mahmoudieh is a designer.

Life and career
Born in Germany, of mixed Persian-German parentage, Mahmoudieh studied Art History in Florence, Architecture at the École d'Interieur in Geneva and at UCLA in the United States, and Interior Design at the College of Nôtre Dame in Belmont.

After graduating from UCLA she opened her first studio in Los Angeles and today has her headquarters in London. She has worked on projects worldwide. She has also worked as a specifier for Ligne-Roset group.

In 2013, Mahmoudieh launched a tech start-up called myKidsy, its main office is based on Campus London sponsored by Google. myKidsy is the first online marketplace for parents to book activities for their kids (after school, holidays and weekend activities).

Yasmine has launched www.impactdesingnow.com where she innovated 3d printing out of recycled plastic waste.
Her first design the Flow Chair has won several international awards and recently the sitaward.

Yasmine has also received the Sirius Award in sustainability in architecture and design for hospitality in 2022.

Yasmine has been invited to lecture about her sustainable design during this years World Economic Forum in Davos.

Work
Mahmoudieh has worked in a variety of architectural fields, ranging from aircraft interior design on the Airbus A380 to the Massachusetts Museum of Contemporary Art. She has designed office buildings and interiors, such as the German headquarters of Aon, and has worked on buildings and interiors for Radisson, Kempinski and InterContinental. She has also created a specialised hotel for the disabled.

She has acted as a judge on various architecture and design awards, including the Red Dot Awards, Interzum Awards and the Boutique & Lifestyle Hospitality Awards. Mahmoudieh has won several awards herself, including the EuroShop 2011 award, World Travel Award 2007 for the InterContinental Berchtesgaden, European Hotel Design Award 2004 for the Radisson SAS Berlin, Hotel Design Award 2003 for Haus Rheinsberg, European Hotel Design Award 2003 in the Innovation category, and the Core Design Award 2002 for Haus Rheinsberg.

Architectural work

Conceptual projects

Flyotel Hotel (2009–2013), Dubai, UAE - pending

Completed projects
Flowniversum at Design Miami Basel ( 2022), Switzerland 
Strandhotel Atlantic and Villa Meeresstrand , 2020, Usedom, Baltic Sea 
Augeo Art and Spa ( 2015), Rimini,  Italy - International Art Gallery and Luxury Spa
C Park ( 2013), Mid Sussex, United Kingdom - concept for a spiritual and business of a luxury hotel
Hi-Macs Stand for Euroshop 2011 (2011), Düsseldorf, Germany - Exhibition Design
Little Bodrum Masterplan (2008–2010), Bodrum, Turkey - Domestic Hotel
 Hotel Nevai (2008), Verbier, Switzerland - Hotel
Barbu Vacarescu (2008), Bucharest, Romania - Office Tower
Markaryan Apartments (2008), Moscow, Russia - Residential
San Nicci (2007), Berlin, Germany - Restaurant
Hainstraße (2007), Leipzig, Germany - Office
Kunsthalle (2007), Berlin, Germany - Art Hall
Moscow Ocean Park (2007), Moscow, Russia - Shopping Mall
Ivanstaroff (2006), St.Petersburg, Russia - Hotel
Hotel Interlaken (2006), Interlaken, Switzerland - Hotel
Johannisberger Straße (2006), Berlin, Germany - Office
Praxis Bergmann (2006), Berlin, Germany - Doctor's Office
Hotel Spreebogen (2006), Berlin, Germany - Hotel
Aparthotel Adler A-Saalbach (2005), Hinterglemm, Austria - Hotel
Shopping Centre (2005), Rzeszow, Poland - Retail
Obersalzberg Intercontinental (2005), Berchtesgaden, Germany - Hotel
Five+Sensotel (2005), Wilisau, Switzerland - Hotel
Lounge/Bar Berlinale VIP-Club (2005), Berlin, Germany - Temporary Showroom
Radisson SAS (2004), Berlin, Germany - Hotel
Lounge/Bar Berlinale VIP-Club (2004), Berlin, Germany - Temporary Showroom
Chinese Herb Depot (2003), Berlin, Germany - Retail
Residenz Kristall (2002), Hamburg, Germany - Residential
Hotel Rheinsberg, (2001), Rheinsberg, Germany - Hotel
Project Development Königsallee (2001), Düsseldorf, Germany - Hotel
Radisson SAS (2001), Copenhagen, Denmark - Hotel
Airbus A380 (2001), - Confidential Project
Carpe Diem Lounge (2000), Düsseldorf, Germany - Showroom
Anderson Consulting (2000), Frankfurt am Main, Germany - Office
Büro Listmann (2000), Mainz, Germany - Office
Fishergate Shopping Centre (2000), Preston, UK - Retail
Weston Hotel Golf Resort (2000), Crewe, UK - Hotel
Deutscher Pavilion (2000), Hannover, Germany - Temporary Exhibition – VIP Lounge
Radisson SAS (2000), Oslo, Norway - Hotel
Aon Double X-Building (1999), Hamburg, Germany - Office
Millennium Centre (1997) Budapest, Hungary - Retail
Hotel Kempinski (1998), Bad Saarow, Germany - Hotel
Strandhotel Hübner (1997), Warnemünde, Germany - Hotel
Office Garbe (1996), Hamburg, Germany - Office
Trias Büro (1995), Berlin, Germany -  Office
Hotel Baltschug (1995), Moscow, Russia - Hotel
Alsterpavillion (1995), Hamburg, Germany - Restaurant
Adolf Horchler (1994), Hamburg, Germany - Temporary Stand
Hotel Vier Jahreszeiten (1994), Hamburg, Germany - Hotel
Factory (1994), Berlin, Germany - Restaurant
Ramada Garni Hotels (1993), Leipzig, Germany - Hotel Competition Winner
Massachusetts Museum of Contemporary Art (1989), North Adams, MA, United States - Museum
Manhattan West (1988), Los Angeles, United States - Restaurant
Regent Beverly Wilrshire Hotel (1988), Beverly Hills, United States - Hotel
Merck, Finck & Co (1988), Berlin, Germany - Office
Sapori Ristorante (1987), Newport Beach, United States - Restaurant
Gordon Eckhard Production (1987), Hollywood, United States - Sound Studio
Coconat Grove Plaza(1986), Florida, United States - Shopping Centre
Anna-Marie de la Bruyere (1986), Beverly Hills, United States - Renovation

Future projects

Palazzo Spina (2010–2011), Rimini, Italy - Art and SPA concept

Awards

EUROSHOP AWARD, 2011: Stand for HI-MACS®
WORLD TRAVEL AWARD, 2007: Resort Intercontinental Berchtesgaden
EUROPEAN HOTEL DESIGN AWARD, 2004: Radisson SAS Berlin
INNOVATION AWARD, 2003: European Hotel Design Award & Conference
HOTEL DESIGN AWARD, 2003 AND CORE DESIGN AWARD, 2002: Haus Rheins

Lectures by Yasmine Mahmoudieh

(03.11.2011), VCCP - Digital Interiors, London, United Kingdom
(21.10.2011), ISHC 2011 Conference, Istanbul, Turkey - Next generation Hotel Design
(26.09.2011), IoD, From Passion to Profit, London, United Kingdom - Debate on entrepreneurship
(15.06.2011), Hotel Real Estate Convention, Düsseldorf, Germany - Visions of the modern nomadic way of life
(10.03.2011), MIPIM, Cannes, France - The Digital Era
(09.03.2011), MIPIM, Cannes, France - France Lifestyle meets HTL
(14.01.2011), AIT-Hotelplattform Heimtextil, Frankfurt, Germany - AIT think-tank, 'Hotel Design'
(18-21.11.2010), AIT-Platform Hotel Architecture, Venice, Italy - Hotel conference
(05.05.2010), ATM, Dubai, UAE - Leading by design - the five senses
(15-18.03.2010), MIPIM, Cannes, France - Redesigning landmarks hotels
(04-06.03.2010), HI Design EMEA 10, Malta - Room for change in hospitality design
(20.04.2007), UCLA, Los Angeles, United States - Lecture
(17.01.2007), Marko-Architecture Fair, Munich, Germany - Lecture "Technology and Design"

Videos

Hotel der Zukunft by Yasmine Mahmoudieh.
Hotel of the Future by Yasmine Mahmoudieh.
British Satellite News on Yasmine Mahmoudieh.

References

External links 
 Mahmoudieh Design website
Style Park website
www.mykidsy.com

Iranian architects
German people of Iranian descent
Notre Dame de Namur University alumni
UCLA School of the Arts and Architecture alumni
Living people
German expatriates in Switzerland
German expatriates in the United States
German expatriates in Italy
Year of birth missing (living people)
Women chief executives